The Ford CHT (Compound High Turbulence) engine is an inline four-cylinder internal combustion engine produced by the Ford Motor Company in Brazil during the 1980s and 1990s. It is unrelated to the similarly-named CVH engine.

The CHT was introduced in 1984 in the Mark 3 Escort, the first of the series to be released in Brazil. It was later used in the Ford Del Rey and the Verona (a Brazilian Orion), as well as the Volkswagen Gol.

This engine was based on the Renault Cléon-Fonte engine introduced in 1962. Ford do Brasil inherited this engine upon buying the Brazilian Willys/Renault operation in the late 1960s. It has overhead valves (two per cylinder) and features a rotating valve design.

Ford do Brasil used the Cléon-Fonte engine until 1983, when they made a thorough redesign to the head and renamed it CHT. There was also a smaller  version with a  bore. The Corcel-derived Pampa pickup truck also used the Cléon-Fonte engine until replaced with the CHT in 1984.

The goal of the redesign was to create an internal turbulence in the combustion chambers to promote more complete combustion. The resulting unit was robust and economical, albeit with modest performance compared to the competing Volkswagen EA827 engine family. The CHT has lower peak power output but with generally higher average torque, with the torque curve being much flatter and closer to the maximum at any engine speed. Torque was the CHT engine's advantage, it being capable of running without much loss of power in very low engine speeds as well.

It was also available to run on ethanol.

Three models were originally available:
 1.6 petrol 
 1.6 ethanol 
 1.6 XR ethanol  for the Escort XR3

Later, the engine was tuned for better power figures and fuel efficiency:
 1.6 petrol 
 1.6 ethanol 

In 1987, with the release of the Mark 4 Ford Escort, this engine benefited from some revisions, resulting in the CHT E-Max (maximised economy) version. All the new models featured better torque. This, the second generation CHT engine received the award of most economical engine of its time in Brazil, capable of running  of petrol.

It was installed in both the Escort Hobby and the Volkswagen Gol:
 1.0 petrol .

During the Autolatina period (1987–1996) Volkswagen used this engine, naming it AE-1600 and AE-1000 when fitted to VWs - but this is largely the same engine. AE stands for Alta Economia (High Economy). In 1996 and 1997 the CHT was gradually replaced. In Volkswagens, the AE-1000 was replaced by the EA111 and the AE-1600 by the EA827. In Fords, the CHT was replaced either by the Zetec 16-valve unit in 1.8L and 2.0L versions, the Zetec RoCam 1.0L and 1.6L from 2000 onwards or the older Kent Endura-E in early Fiesta and Ka models preceding development and introduction of the aforementioned Brazilian designed RoCam engine.

References

CHT
Volkswagen Group engines
CHT
Straight-four engines
Gasoline engines by model